Clarissa Tossin (born 1973) is a Brazilian artist. She was born in Porto Alegre, Brazil. She received an MFA degree form Calarts in 2009. 

Tossin was selected to take part in the Hammer Museum's 2014 Made in L.A. exhibition. Her work is included in the collections of the Whitney Museum of American Art. She was a Radcliffe Institute Fellow at Harvard University from 2017 to 2018.

References

External links 
 

1973 births
Living people
Radcliffe fellows
20th-century Brazilian women artists
21st-century Brazilian women artists
21st-century Brazilian artists
California Institute of the Arts alumni